Sebring High School is a public high school in Sebring, Florida.  Around 1,600 students currently attend the school.

Notable alumni
Ralph McGill, former safety for the San Francisco 49ers (1972–1977) and the New Orleans Saints (1978–1979)
Ronnie Lippett, former cornerback for the New England Patriots (1983–1991)

References

Sebring, Florida
Public high schools in Florida